The 2019 Scotland Tri-Nation Series was the first round of the 2019–2023 ICC Cricket World Cup League 2 cricket tournament and took place in Scotland in August 2019. It was a tri-nation series between Oman, Papua New Guinea and the Scotland cricket teams, with the matches played as One Day International (ODI) fixtures. The ICC Cricket World Cup League 2 formed part of the qualification pathway to the 2023 Cricket World Cup. After the series, Scotland were at the top of the points table, after finishing ahead of Oman on net run rate, with both teams level on points.

The opening match of the tournament saw Oman beat Papua New Guinea by four wickets to record their first win in an ODI cricket match. Oman also won the next game of the series, beating hosts Scotland by eight wickets. Scotland won the next match by three wickets, against Papua New Guinea, with their captain Kyle Coetzer making 96 runs in the run chase. In the fourth match, Scotland beat Oman by 85 runs, with Hamza Tahir taking his first five-wicket haul for the hosts in ODI cricket. The fifth match, between Scotland and Papua New Guinea, was used to help raise funds for a local cancer charity. Scotland went on to win the match by 38 runs to record their third win of the series. In the final match, Oman beat Papua New Guinea by four wickets, leaving Papua New Guinea without a win in the series.

Squads

Fixtures

1st ODI

2nd ODI

3rd ODI

4th ODI

5th ODI

6th ODI

References

External links
 Series home at ESPN Cricinfo

2019 in Scottish cricket
2019 in Omani cricket
2019 in Papua New Guinean cricket
International cricket competitions in 2019
Scotland
August 2019 sports events in the United Kingdom